The men's Over 94 kg (+206.8 lbs) Light-Contact category at the W.A.K.O. World Championships 2007 in Belgrade was the heaviest of the male Light-Contact tournaments with the closest equivalent being super heavyweight in the Low-Kick and K-1 weight classes.  There were fifteen men from two continents (Europe and Africa) taking part in the competition.  Each of the matches was three rounds of two minutes each and were fought under Light-Contact rules.

Because there was one too few fighters for a sixteen-man tournament, one of the contestants was given a bye into the quarter finals.  The tournament gold medalist was the Polish fighter Michal Wszelak who defeated his opponent from the Ukraine, Igor Kravchuk, in the final by abandonment as Igor suffered an injury during the final match.  Semi finalists Csaba Podor from Hungary and Pascal Blunschi from Switzerland both received bronze medals.

Results

Key

See also
List of WAKO Amateur World Championships
List of WAKO Amateur European Championships
List of male kickboxers

References

External links
 WAKO World Association of Kickboxing Organizations Official Site

Kickboxing events at the WAKO World Championships 2007 Belgrade
2007 in kickboxing
Kickboxing in Serbia